Urbania is a comune (municipality) in the Province of Pesaro e Urbino in the Italian region of Marche, located about  west of Ancona and about  southwest of Pesaro, next to the river Metauro.

Urbania borders the following municipalities: Acqualagna, Apecchio, Cagli, Fermignano, Peglio, Piobbico, Sant'Angelo in Vado, Urbino.

It is a famous ceramics and majolica production centre. In recent years, it has become more closely associated with the Befana folk tradition.

History
Originally known as Castel delle Ripe, it was a free commune of the Guelph party. In 1277 it was destroyed by the Ghibellines, then rebuilt by the Provençal Guillaume Durand in 1284 and christened Castel Durante. Later it was ruled by the Brancaleoni family. When the latter were ousted, the city offered itself to the Dukes of Urbino, who used the palace in the city as summer residence and had it restored by architects such as Francesco di Giorgio Martini. The last della Rovere duke, Francesco Maria II, is buried in the Ducal Palace of Urbania.

In 1631 it became part of the Papal States. Five years later its name changed to the current one, in honor of Pope Urban VIII.

On 23 January 1944 Urbania was bombed by the Allies, resulting in the deaths of 250 civilians. It was a Sunday so the people had gathered in the town, increasing the number of victims.

After World War II Urbania received the Bronze Medal for Military Valour for the deeds of its citizens during the partisan warfare.

Geology
The base of the Chattian international stratigraphical stage is located in Urbania and is marked by a GSSP and commemorative sign which were installed there in May 2017.

Main sights

 Ducal Palace: The palace houses a museum and a library. Among the prize holdings are globes made by the Flemish-born, German natural scientist Gerardus Mercator between 1541 and 1551.
 Chiesa dei Morti (Church of the Dead), with 18 natural mummies from the Middle Ages and the Renaissance exposed behind the altar.
 The medieval walls.
 The 'Barco Ducale' is one kilometer outside of the town. It was erected in 1465. After an earthquake, it was rebuilt between 1741 and 1771. Normally you can not enter the building.
Urbania Cathedral
Santa Caterina
Santa Chiara
Santissimo Crocifisso
San Francesco
Santa Maria Maddalena

Population History

Trivia
Urbania features as the main setting of Ci Siamo a textbook for students of Italian used by many Australian students in the middle years of high school.

References

External links

 Urbania official website

 
Cities and towns in the Marche